Charles Edward Pogue Jr. (born January 18, 1950) is an American screenwriter, playwright and stage actor. He is best known for writing the screenplays of The Hound of the Baskervilles (1983), Psycho III (1986), The Fly (1986) and Dragonheart (1996).

Early life
Pogue was born on January 18, 1950, in Cincinnati, Ohio, the son of Charles Edward Pogue Sr. (1921–1994) and Ruth Elizabeth Hick (1921–2010). He grew up in Fort Thomas, Kentucky, and graduated from Highlands High School in 1968. He earned a degree in theater arts from the University of Kentucky in 1972 where he was active in theatre productions.

Career
Pogue began writing plays and screenplays after moving to Los Angeles, California. He has worked in the science fiction, fantasy, horror, and thriller genres, and he has also scripted several Sherlock Holmes adaptations: The Hound of the Baskervilles, The Sign of Four, and Hands of a Murderer.  His most well-known work to date is probably the acclaimed 1986 remake of The Fly; he provided the initial drafts, though his work was heavily rewritten by David Cronenberg, the film's director.

He has expressed his disappointment with the films that were made from his screenplays for Dragonheart and Kull the Conqueror, saying that they were ruined by studio interference. Whereas he believes that his most satisfying achievement was The Hound of the Baskervilles.

Pogue is also a renowned actor in regional theater who has worked onstage with such stars as Charlton Heston, Jeremy Brett, Cyd Charisse, Martha Raye and Deanna Dunagan.

From 1997 to 2001, Pogue served on the board of directors of the Writers Guild of America, West.

Pogue and his wife Julieanne Beasley reside in Georgetown, Kentucky. They are both very active in theatre productions and he frequently works with the Actors Guild of Lexington in Lexington, Kentucky.

Filmography

Plays
Whoddunit, Darling? (1983)
The Ebony Ape (1987)
Tartuffe (2007)

Novels
Dragonheart (1996; based on his original screenplay)

References

External links 
 
 Pogue's Pages
 Writing from the Soul by Charles Edward Pogue

1950 births
Living people
Screenwriters from California
American male screenwriters
American television writers
American male television writers
American male novelists
American male stage actors
20th-century American dramatists and playwrights
21st-century American dramatists and playwrights
20th-century American novelists
20th-century American male actors
21st-century American male actors
Writers from Cincinnati
Novelists from Kentucky
Writers from Los Angeles
Male actors from Cincinnati
People from Fort Thomas, Kentucky
People from Georgetown, Kentucky
Highlands High School (Fort Thomas, Kentucky) alumni
University of Kentucky alumni
20th-century American male writers
21st-century American male writers
Novelists from Ohio
Screenwriters from Ohio
Screenwriters from Kentucky